This timeline is a chronology of significant events in the history of the U.S. State of Montana and the historical area now occupied by the state.


2020s

2010s

2000s

1990s

1980s

1970s

1960s

1950s

1940s

1930s

1920s

1910s

1900s

1890s

1880s

1870s

1860s

1850s

1840s

1830s

1820s

1810s

1800s

1790s

1780s

1770s

1760s

1690s

1680s

1590s

1540s

1510s

1490s

Before 1492

See also

History of Montana
Bibliography of Montana history
Bibliography of Yellowstone National Park
Territorial evolution of Montana
Territory of Montana
State of Montana
Timeline of pre-statehood Montana history
Index of Montana-related articles
List of cities and towns in Montana
List of counties in Montana
List of ghost towns in Montana
List of governors of Montana
List of places in Montana
Outline of Montana

References
References are included in the linked articles.

External links

State of Montana website
Montana State Historical Society website

Timeline of Montana history
Timeline of Montana history
Timelines of states of the United States
United States history timelines